= Trail Blazers Trumpets =

Theme song

"Trail Blazers Trumpets", sometimes called "Blazers Theme Song" is the unofficial theme song of the Portland Trail Blazers, written by Brian Bennett. Starting with the 1978–79 season and continuing for more than 30 years, the music was used at the beginning and end of Blazers radio and television broadcasts. The song comes from a 1976 recording issued by KPM entitled "Hot Wax" and the original name of the song is "Capital City."

Portugal. The Man covered the song at the 2018 Coachella Festival. A recorded version by the band appeared on a 2019 limited edition album released by the team.
